Herbjørnsrud is a Norwegian surname. Notable people with the surname include:

Dag Herbjørnsrud (born 1971), Norwegian historian and journalist
Hans Herbjørnsrud (born 1938), Norwegian writer

Norwegian-language surnames